The term nano gap was coined by accounting firm Deloitte to describe the shortage of capital to fund the retirement of baby-boomer entrepreneurs seeking to sell their small, medium enterprises (SMEs). In the Deloitte report: "Micro-cap typically refers to those companies with an equity value of less than $250 million. Nano-cap is another term that is used to refer to companies with a value of less than $10 million."

Canada's nano gap
In Canada, the retirement and sale of baby boomer businesses has been described as one of the largest ongoing generational transfers of wealth in the country's history. Estimates as to the size of this transfer range as high as $1.9 trillion over the next two decades.

The demographic trend driving this transfer is powerful. According to Statistics Canada there are 1.4 million small businesses in Canada. Almost all of them are owned by baby boomers. More than half of all SME owners in Canada are set to retire over the next decade with between 300,000 and 500,000 are planning to transfer control of their companies within the next five years.

Capital shortage
The nano-gap issue arises as there is a shortage of organized capital in the $2 to $20M acquisition range. Because of this sellers are facing relatively low valuations. This in turn represents a largely un-recognized buying opportunity. "With a glut of baby boomer-owned SMEs imminently available, there is an untapped and growing opportunity for Canadian private equity firms to realize significant value at the low end of the micro-cap market. Canada is arriving at a natural inflection point where baby boomer small business owners will need to consider selling. This will sharply increase the supply of available businesses – a market reality that simply did not exist five or ten years ago". It has been estimated that almost $2 trillion of businesses will be coming up for sale over the next decade which is twice as large as the assets of the top 1,000 Canadian pension plans and approximately the same size as Canadian annual GDP.

SME PE capital in Canada
There is a limited amount of PE capital in Canada and very little focusing on this nano-gap market as reflected by the higher overall returns to PE investments in Canada and particularly to smaller PE transactions. According to the CVCA, over the last 10 years Canadian PE has generated 14.2% CAGRs while the US (sub $250 million deal size) generated only 3.4% over the same time frame.

SME succession planning in Canada
According to Alberta Treasury Branch research "baby boomer SMEs owners/operators are nearing retirement age. In fact, four in ten (42%) of the financial decision makers we talked to are 55 years of age or older. Another ATB survey (ATB Customer Advisory Panel Feb 21, 2013 - Mar 7, 2013) found nearly six in ten (58%) businesses do not have a succession plan in place. And of those 55 years of age or older, almost half (48%) do not have a succession plan. Top reasons cited were: "it's too early to plan", "I don't know", "I don't want to think about leaving", and "I don't have time to deal with the issue".

See also 

 Private equity
 Venture capital
 CVCA
 Seed funding
 CAGR
 Baby boomer
 EBITDA

References 

Demographic economic problems
Deloitte